This is a list of matches and results of the Sri Lanka national rugby union team. In Reverse Chronological Order:

(Except for tournaments which follow tournament progress).

Overall Record

Sri Lankan Test record against all nations:

2010s

2013

2013 Serendib International Cup

Sri Lanka v Poland

Touch judges:

Notes:
 This was the first official test match between the two nations. 
 This was the third official test match between Sri Lanka and a European team.

Sri Lanka v Madagascar

Touch judges:

 
Notes:
 This was the first official test match between the two nations. 
 This was the first official test match between Sri Lanka and an African team.

2013 HSBC Asian Five Nations

Sri Lanka v Kazakhstan

Touch judges:
 Taizo Hirabayashi
 Aaron Littlewood
 Sean Moore

Sri Lanka v Thailand

Touch judges:
 Taku Otsuki
 Priyantha Gunarathna
 Sean Moore

Sri Lanka v Chinese Taipei

Touch judges:
 Aaron Littlewood
 Mohamed Cader
 Sean Moore

2012

2012 HSBC Asian Five Nations

Sri Lanka v Philippines

Notes:
 This was the first official test match between the two nations.

Sri Lanka v Singapore

Sri Lanka v Chinese Taipei

2011

2011 HSBC Asian Five Nations

Sri Lanka v Japan

Sri Lanka v Kazakhstan

Sri Lanka v Hong Kong

Touch judges:
 

Sri Lanka v United Arab Emirates

Notes:
 This was the first official test match between the two nations. 
 This was the first official test match for the United Arab Emirates.

Touch judges:
 Anthony Tobi Lothian 
 D. Nimal

2010

2010 HSBC Asian Five Nations

Sri Lanka v Singapore

Sri Lanka v Chinese Taipei

2000s

2009

2009 HSBC Asian Five Nations

Sri Lanka v Thailand

Sri Lanka v Chinese Taipei

2008

2008 HSBC Asian Five Nations

Sri Lanka v Chinese Taipei

Sri Lanka v Singapore

2007

2007 Rugby Asiad

Sri Lanka v Kazakhstan

Sri Lanka v Malaysia

Sri Lanka v China

2007 Asian Nations Series

Sri Lanka v Kazakhstan

Sri Lanka v Arabian Gulf

2006

2007 Rugby World Cup qualifying

Sri Lanka v Hong Kong

Sri Lanka v China

2005

2007 Rugby World Cup qualifying

Sri Lanka v Kazakhstan

Sri Lanka v Kazakhstan

Sri Lanka v Singapore

Sri Lanka v Thailand

2004

2004 ARFU Asian Rugby Championship

Sri Lanka v China

Sri Lanka v Pakistan

Internationals

Sri Lanka v Thailand

Sri Lanka v India

2003

Sri Lanka v Hong Kong

Sri Lanka v Arabian Gulf

2002

 
2002 ARFU Asian Rugby Championship

Sri Lanka v Malaysia

Sri Lanka v India

Sri Lanka v Thailand

Sri Lanka v Kazakhstan

2002 Asian Games

Sri Lanka v Chinese Taipei

Sri Lanka v Japan

Sri Lanka v Korea

2003 Rugby World Cup qualifying

Sri Lanka v Kazakhstan

Sri Lanka v China

2001

2001 ARFU Asian Rugby Championship

Sri Lanka v Thailand

Sri Lanka v Malaysia

2000

2000 ARFU Asian Rugby Championship

Sri Lanka v Singapore

Sri Lanka v China

Sri Lanka v Thailand

1990s

1999

Sri Lanka tour of Malaysia

Sri Lanka v Thailand

1998

Rugby union at the 1998 Asian Games

Sri Lanka v Chinese Taipei

Sri Lanka v Japan

Sri Lanka v Thailand

Sri Lanka v Korea

1998 ARFU Asian Rugby Championship

Sri Lanka v Singapore

Sri Lanka v Malaysia

Sri Lanka v China

1999 Rugby World Cup qualifying

Sri Lanka v Chinese Taipei

1997

1999 Rugby World Cup qualifying

Sri Lanka v Malaysia

1992 Sri Lanka tour Thailand

Sri Lanka v Malaysia 

Sri Lanka v Singapore 

Sri Lanka v Thailand 

1999 Rugby World Cup qualifying

Sri Lanka v Singapore

Sri Lanka v Thailand

1996

1996 ARFU Asian Rugby Championship

Sri Lanka v Malaysia

Sri Lanka v Hong Kong

Sri Lanka v Korea

1995
No 'A' Internationals played.

1994

1994 ARFU Asian Rugby Championship & 1995 Rugby World Cup qualifying

Sri Lanka v Chinese Taipei

Sri Lanka v Japan

Sri Lanka v Malaysia

1993
No 'A' Internationals played.

1992

1992 ARFU Asian Rugby Championship

Sri Lanka v Singapore

Sri Lanka v Japan

Sri Lanka v Chinese Taipei

Sri Lanka tour of Papua New Guinea 

Sri Lanka v Papua New Guinea

Sri Lanka v Papua New Guinea

1991
No 'A' Internationals played.

1990

1990 ARFU Asian Rugby Championship

Sri Lanka v Korea

Sri Lanka v Chinese Taipei

Sri Lanka v Hong Kong

1980s

1989
No 'A' Internationals played.

1988

1988 ARFU Asian Rugby Championship

Sri Lanka v Korea

Sri Lanka v Malaysia

Sri Lanka v Hong Kong

1987
No 'A' Internationals played.

1986

1986 ARFU Asian Rugby Championship

Sri Lanka v Malaysia

Sri Lanka v Japan

1985
No 'A' Internationals played.

1984

1984 ARFU Asian Rugby Championship

Sri Lanka v Malaysia

Sri Lanka v Thailand

Sri Lanka v Korea

1983
No 'A' Internationals played.

1982

1982 ARFU Asian Rugby Championship

Sri Lanka v Korea

Sri Lanka v Malaysia

Sri Lanka v Singapore

1981
No 'A' Internationals played.

1980

1980 ARFU Asian Rugby Championship

Sri Lanka v Malaysia

Sri Lanka v Japan

Sri Lanka v Hong Kong

1970s

1979
No 'A' Internationals played.

1978

1978 ARFU Asian Rugby Championship

Sri Lanka v Japan

Sri Lanka v Thailand

1977
No 'A' Internationals played.

1976
No 'A' Internationals played.

1975
No 'A' Internationals played.

1974

1974 ARFU Asian Rugby Championship

Sri Lanka v Japan

Sri Lanka v Malaysia

Sri Lanka v Laos

Sri Lanka v Singapore

1973
No 'A' Internationals played.

1972

1972 ARFU Asian Rugby Championship

Sri Lanka v Korea

Sri Lanka v Singapore

Sri Lanka v Japan

Sri Lanka v Malaysia

1971

1971 England rugby union tour of Ceylon

Ceylon v England

Ceylon v England

1970

1970 ARFU Asian Rugby Championship

Ceylon v Thailand

Notes:
 This was the first official test match between the two nations.

1960s
No 'A' Internationals played.

1950s

1951 to 1959
No 'A' Internationals played.

1950

1950 British Lions tour to New Zealand and Australia

Ceylon v British and Irish Lions

Notes:
 This was the first official test match between the two nations. 
 This was the first official test match between Ceylon and a European team.

1940s
No 'A' Internationals played.

1930s
No 'A' Internationals played.

1920s

1927 to 1929
No 'A' Internationals played.

1926

1926–27 New Zealand Māori rugby union tour

Ceylon v New Zealand Maori

Notes:
 This was the first official and only test match between the two teams.

1920 to 1925
No 'A' Internationals played.

1910s
No 'A' Internationals played.

1900s

1907

1907–1908 New Zealand rugby tour of Australia and Great Britain

All Ceylon v New Zealand

Notes:
 This was the first official test match between the two nations. 
 This was the first official test match between Sri Lanka and an Oceanian team.

References

External links
ESPN Scrum
 Complete List of Test Matches
 Sri Lanka Test Match record
 Teams against Sri Lanka
 Test tours and Series

Others
 Sri Lankan Results IRB
 Sri Lankan Results

Sri Lanka national rugby union team
rugby union team
Sri Lanka